Blepharomastix ranalis, the hollow-spotted blepharomastix moth,  is a species of grass moth of the family Crambidae found in the eastern and southern United States, and Mexico.

Description

Adults
Adult wings are typically spread horizontally at rest, with the forewing spread further than the hindwing.  Wings have a pale, tan ground color interrupted by dark brown antemedial, postmedial, and dashed terminal lines. The postmedial line of the forewing turns sharply toward the median area and again toward the inner margin.  The median area of the forewing contains an orbicular spot and a reniform spot, each outlined in brown, giving them a hollow appearance.

Range
The species' occurrence range extends from Arizona, Oklahoma, and Wisconsin in the west to Florida, New Hampshire, and Quebec in the east.

Life cycle

Adults
Adults have been reported from March to October, with most sightings from April to August.

References

Moths described in 1854
Blepharomastix
Moths of North America